Pokharia is a village in West Champaran district in the Indian state of Bihar.

Demographics
As of 2011 India census, Pokharia had a population of 1791 in 301 households. Males constitute 53.2% of the population and females 46.7%. Pokharia has an average literacy rate of 55.5%, lower than the national average of 74%: male literacy is 60.9%, and female literacy is 39%. In Pokharia, 16.6% of the population is under 6 years of age.

References

Villages in West Champaran district